Anuloma Pranayama is one of several Pranayama or breath exercises used in the practice of Hatha yoga.
Anu roughly translates as with and Loma means hair implying "with the grain" or "natural".  It is the opposite of Viloma Prāṇāyāma which means against the grain.

Similar to the practice of Nadi Shodhana (commonly called alternate nostril breathing and known in some circles as Anuloma Viloma) is the practice of inhaling through both nostrils together and exhaling each breath alternately between the left and right nostrils. The thumb of the right hand is used to manipulate the right nostril, while the pinky and ring finger are used to control the left nostril.
Inverted Anuloma breath is called Pratiloma and involves inhaling through alternating nostrils and exhaling through both together.  The practice of a kumbhaka or retention is encouraged as students advance at the practice; first at the end of the inhale and eventually the end of the exhale.

When practiced as Saṃa Vṛtti the inhalation, retention and exhalation are all of equal duration. More advanced students may employ Viṣaṃa Vṛtti or uneven breath, using ratios such as 1:4:2 (one beat inhale, four beat retention, and a two beat exhale).  According to many traditions this is not recommended for beginners or anyone practicing without the guidance of an experienced teacher.

yathā siṃho ghajo vyāghro bhavedvaśyaḥ śanaiḥ śanaiḥ |
tathaiva sevito vāyuranyathā hanti sādhakam || 15 ||

Just as lions, elephants and tigers are controlled by and by, so the breath is controlled by slow degrees, otherwise (i.e., by being hasty or using too much force) it kills the practiser himself.

Hatha Yoga Pradipika

References

Pranayama